The 2018 UAE Super Cup was the 11th professional and 18th overall edition of the UAE Super Cup, held at the 30 June Stadium, Cairo on 25 August 2018, between Al Ain, winners of both the 2017–18 UAE Pro-League and 2017–18 UAE President's Cup, and Al Wahda, winners of the 2017–18 UAE League Cup. Al Wahda won the game 4–3 on penalties.

Details

See also
2017–18 UAE Pro-League
2017–18 UAE President's Cup
2017–18 UAE League Cup

References

External links

UAE Super Cup
Al Ain FC matches
UAE Super Cup seasons